Ceira is a civil parish in Coimbra Municipality, Portugal. The population in 2011 was 3,701, in an area of 12.42 km².

References

Freguesias of Coimbra